Polygala helenae is a species of plant in the family Polygalaceae. It is endemic to Greece.  Its natural habitat is Mediterranean-type shrubby vegetation. It is threatened by habitat loss.

References

helenae
Critically endangered plants
Endemic flora of Greece
Taxonomy articles created by Polbot